Limerick City is a parliamentary constituency in Dáil Éireann, the lower house of the Irish parliament or Oireachtas. The constituency elects 4 deputies (Teachtaí Dála, commonly known as TDs) on the system of proportional representation by means of the single transferable vote (PR-STV).

History and boundaries
The Constituency Commission proposed in 2007 that at the next general election a constituency called Limerick City be created from territory which had been in Limerick East. It was established by the Electoral (Amendment) Act 2009. Limerick City was first represented at the 2011 general election.

From the 2020 general election, the constituency has comprised Limerick City and suburbs, part of County Limerick and a small part of County Tipperary. The Electoral (Amendment) (Dáil Constituencies) Act 2017 defines the constituency as:

TDs

Elections

2020 general election

2016 general election

2011 general election

See also
Dáil constituencies
Elections in the Republic of Ireland
Politics of the Republic of Ireland
List of Dáil by-elections
List of political parties in the Republic of Ireland

References

Dáil constituencies
Politics of County Limerick
Politics of Limerick (city)
2011 establishments in Ireland
Constituencies established in 2011